Mureș may refer to:

 Mureș County, Romania
 Mureș (river) in Romania and Hungary (Maros)
 Mureș culture, a Bronze Age culture from Romania

See also
 Târgu Mureș, the capital of Mureș County
 Ocna Mureș, a town in Alba County, Romania